The  is a Bo-Bo-Bo wheel arrangement DC electric locomotive type operated by Japan Freight Railway Company (JR Freight) on freight services in Japan.

The locomotives are built at the Kawasaki Heavy Industries factory in Kobe. Based at Okayama, Shin-Tsurumi, and Suita (Osaka) depots, they are primarily used on freight on the Tokaido Main Line and Sanyo Main Line, replacing Class EF66 locomotives.

, 101 EF210s were operated by JR Freight, based at Shin-Tsurumi (Kawasaki), Suita (Osaka), and Okayama depots.

Variants
 Class EF210-901, prototype
 Class EF210-0, full-production version
 Class EF210-100
 Class EF210-300, banking locomotives

EF210-901
The pre-production prototype, EF210-901, was delivered to Shin-Tsurumi depot in 1996.

EF210-0 full-production version

Following evaluation of the prototype version, the first full-production locomotive, EF210-1, was delivered to Okayama in July 1998. A number of minor improvements were incorporated, with the main external differences from the prototype being as follows.
 Traction motors changed from FMT3 (565 kW) to FMT4 type (565 kW)
 "ECO-POWER Momo Taro" logo on bodyside
 Reduced bogie size from 2,600 mm to 2,500 mm.

All 18 of the EF210-0s are allocated to Okayama Depot.

EF210-100

The EF210-100 sub-class incorporates a number of minor improvements, including the use of single-arm pantographs, and IGBT replacing GTO.

EF210-100s are based at Okayama, Shin-Tsurumi, and Suita (Osaka) depots, with 73 locomotives in operation .

EF210-300

The first locomotive, EF210-301, was delivered from Kawasaki Heavy Industries in Hyogo on 3 September 2012. It entered service from the start of the revised timetable on 16 March 2013. The second locomotive entered service from 28 April 2013.

The locomotives are painted in an overall-blue livery with yellow lining.

Fleet details

Classification

The EF210 classification for this locomotive type is explained below. As with previous locomotive designs, the prototype is numbered EF210-901, with subsequent production locomotives numbered from EF210-1 onward.
 E: Electric locomotive
 F: Six driving axles
 210: DC locomotive with AC motors

References

External links

 JR Freight website 

1500 V DC locomotives
Electric locomotives of Japan
EF210
Bo-Bo-Bo locomotives
1067 mm gauge locomotives of Japan
Kawasaki locomotives
Railway locomotives introduced in 1996